The 1991 AFC Women's Championship was a women's football tournament held in Fukuoka, Japan from 26 May to 8 June 1991. It was the 8th staging of the AFC Women's Championship.
The 1991 AFC Women's Championship, consisting of nine teams, served as the AFC's qualifying tournament for the 1991 FIFA Women's World Cup. Asia's three berths were given to the two finalists - China and Japan - and the winner of the third place play-off, Chinese Taipei.

Group stage

Group A

Group B

Knockout stage

Semi-finals
Winners qualified for 1991 FIFA Women's World Cup.

Third place match
Winner qualified for 1991 FIFA Women's World Cup.

Final

Awards

External links
 Tables & results at RSSSF.com

Women's Championship
AFC Women's Championship
AFC Women's Asian Cup tournaments
AFC Women's Championship
1991
Afc
AFC Women's Championship
AFC Women's Championship
AFC Women's Championship
Sports competitions in Fukuoka